Whispering Shadows is a 1921 American silent drama film directed by Emile Chautard and starring Lucy Cotton, Charles A. Stevenson and Philip Merivale. It is based on the 1917 play The Invisible Foe by Walter C. Hackett, the rights for which were acquired for six thousand dollars. It was distributed independently on a states rights basis, partly by the former major studio World Film which released it in several markets.

Cast
 Lucy Cotton as Helen Bransby
 Charles A. Stevenson as Richard Bransby
 Philip Merivale as Stephen Pryde
 Robert Barrat as Hugh Brook
 Mabel Archdall as Aunt Caroline Leavitt 
 George Cowl as Dr. Latham
 Alfred Dundas as Morton Grant
 Marion Rogers as Margaret Latham
 Celestine Saunders as The Medium

References

Bibliography
 John T. Soister, Henry Nicolella & Steve Joyce. American Silent Horror, Science Fiction and Fantasy Feature Films, 1913-1929. McFarland, 2014.

External links
 

1921 films
1921 drama films
1920s English-language films
American silent feature films
Silent American drama films
American black-and-white films
Films directed by Emile Chautard
1920s American films